, was a politician and cabinet minister in the Empire of Japan, serving as a member of the Lower House of the Diet of Japan nine times, and twice holding cabinet-level posts.

Biography 
Matsuda was born in Usa District, Ōita prefecture, and was trained as a lawyer, graduating from the predecessor of Chuo University. He was first elected to the Lower House as a representative from Oita Prefecture in 1908.  Joining the Rikken Seiyūkai political party, he switched to the Seiyuhontō in 1924, and Rikken Minseitō in 1927.
                   
In October 1929, Matsuda was picked to be Minister of Colonial Affairs under the Hamaguchi administration, holding that post until April 1931. On July 8, 1934, he became Minister of Education under the Okada administration.  During his tenure as Education Minister, he gained notoriety for a speech made on August 29, 1934, in which he blasted the use of the foreign words "mama" and "papa" by Japanese children when traditional Japanese words existed. The speech was widely reported in western media via Time, which also derided Matsuda for having previously stated that he was the "Lloyd George of the Far East"  Matsuda created further controversy in 1935, when he attempted to interfere in selection of works for display in the Niten Exhibition held by the Japan Art Academy.

Matsuda died in 1936. His grave is at the Tama Cemetery in Fuchū, Tokyo.

References 

1876 births
1936 deaths
People from Ōita Prefecture
Members of the House of Representatives (Empire of Japan)
Government ministers of Japan
Chuo University alumni
Rikken Minseitō politicians